Champion is a Canadian sports biography television series which aired on CBC Television in 1969.

Premise
Michael Magee hosted this series of biographies on prominent Canadian athletes.

Scheduling
This 15-minute series was broadcast on Saturdays at 10:45 p.m. (Eastern) following Hockey Night in Canada from 4 January to 17 April 1969.

References

External links
 

CBC Television original programming
1969 Canadian television series debuts
1969 Canadian television series endings